Margaret Osborne defeated Doris Hart in the final, 6–2, 6–4 to win the ladies' singles tennis title at the 1946 Wimbledon Championships. Pauline Betz was the defending champion, but was ineligible to compete after turning professional.

Seeds

  Margaret Osborne (champion)
  Louise Brough (semifinals)
  Doris Hart (final)
  Pat Todd (quarterfinals)
  Nancye Bolton (quarterfinals)
  Kay Menzies (quarterfinals)
  Sheila Summers (semifinals)
  Jean Bostock (quarterfinals)

Draw

Finals

Top half

Section 1

Section 2

Section 3

Section 4

Bottom half

Section 5

Section 6

Section 7

Section 8

References

External links

Women's Singles
Wimbledon Championship by year – Women's singles
Wimbledon Championships
Wimbledon Championships